Happy Camp was a Chinese variety show produced by Hunan Broadcasting System. The series debuted on 7 July 1997, and was off air on 25 September 2021. The show was hosted by the Happy Family: He Jiong, Li Weijia, Xie Na, Du Haitao and Wu Xin.

Happy Camp was one of China's most popular shows, consistently achieving record high ratings and viewership in its episodes, with a minimum active viewership of tens of millions. The show was broadcast every Saturday, with each of its episodes featuring celebrities and famous figures from all over the world, including musicians, singers, actors, sports players and more. Guests and hosts of the show participated in various activities which include performances, games, interviews, parodies and more.

Because of its tremendous popularity and success, Happy Camp won many awards across Asia and received several international recognitions, while serving as a stage opportunity for many celebrities to showcase their talents or to promote themselves. As the show became so well known, many singers and actors advertised their productions and works, including movies, books and music, on the show. Over the years, the Happy Camp Family has produced numerous music albums and movies.

After the last episode was broadcast on 25 September 2021, the official Weibo account of Happy Camp announced that a new variety show, Hello Saturday, will take its place, marking the end of its 24-year run.

Format
Each episode aired weekly feature several popular celebrities as guest stars. Sometimes other regional celebrities from Hong Kong, China, Japan, South Korea, Taiwan and Singapore are invited. The Happy Camp stage gives many celebrities the opportunity to show their talents. Because the show is so well known, many singers and actors want to advertise their productions such as movies, books and songs.  They participate in interviews, performing, and party games.

Hosts
 2006–present: He Jiong, Xie Na, Li Weijia, Du Haitao, Wu Xin
 2002: He Jiong, Li Weijia, Xie Na
 1999: Li Xiang, He Jiong, Li Weijia
 1998: Li Xiang, He Jiong
 1997: Li Xiang, Hai Bo
 1997: Li Xiang, Li Bing

Background

He Jiong was born in Changsha, Hunan in 1974. He is a well-known host in China. Many people recognize him because of his hosting in the Happy Camp show, which he joined in 1998. Currently, he is still hosting the show, in addition to being the head of the Happy family.  Besides the Happy Camp show, He Jiong was also hosting other shows such as New Year shows. He has published albums, books and movies.  He is also a college professor.

Xie Na was born in 1981 in Deyang, Sichuan. She has performed in many movies and dramas. She has been recognized as a top ten popular host in China, in addition to having produced two albums, a book and many movies. Her special way of hosting the show has brought happiness to the audiences.

Li Weijia was born in 1976 in Changsha, Hunan. He is a Chinese host and actor. His nose was like an aquiline nose, so it became his trademark and was often mistaken for mixed blood.

Du Haitao was born in 1987 in Shenyang, Liaoning. Because of participating in Talent Show, he joined HNTV and from then on began his hosting career. Now, he is one of the most famous hosts in HNTV.

Wu Xin was born in 1983 in Shenyang, Liaoning. She is a Chinese host and actress. Wu attended Shenyang 120 High School. She graduated from Dalian University of Foreign Language, where she majored in French Language.

Theme Song
When it started airing in 1997, "Happiness is the brightest star in the world" (also known as "Happy Like the Wind") composed by Zhang Boxu is used as the theme song.Around 2000, it was changed to "La La Song" as the opening song.

Awards
In 1998, Happy Camp was awarded the star awards and the sixteenth session of Chinese television drama.
In 2005, Happy Camp is " new weekly " as the 15 years of China's most influential one of the television program.
In 2007, Happy Camp was awarded 2007 stars by the year's most popular variety shows and award and The 13 Asian Television Awards ceremony of the 2008 Asian Television Awards for best entertainment program.
In 2009, Happy Camp won the 2009 hot list of Google 's variety show search list and the world record of China's Association 2009 Annual China top-rated TV entertainment program.
Happy family has made an album, making happy camp became the first album of the variety show.
Happy Camp won the first student TV Festival the most watched Entertainment Award (the student TV Festival Provincial Taichung only winning program)
Happy Camp won the second national excellent television culture (Literature) columns and large special programs recommend commend won the excellent column Award (State Administration of Radio Film and Television Award)

Guest appearances

2007

2008

2009

2010

2011

2012

2013

2014

2015

2016

2017

2018

2019

2020

2021

References

1997 Chinese television series debuts
Chinese variety television shows
Mandarin-language television shows